The 1962 Baylor Bears football team represented Baylor University in the Southwest Conference (SWC) during the 1962 NCAA University Division football season. In their fourth season under head coach John Bridgers, the Bears compiled a 4–6 record (3–4 against conference opponents), tied for fourth place in the conference, and were outscored by opponents by a combined total of 169 to 159. They played their home games at Baylor Stadium in Waco, Texas.

The team's statistical leaders included Don Trull with 1,627 passing yards, Tom Davies with 230 rushing yards, Ronnie Goodwin with 414 receiving yards, and Trull, Goodwin, and Larry Elkins each with 24 points scored. Robert Black was the team captain.

Schedule

After the season

The 1963 NFL Draft was held on December 3, 1962. The following Bears were selected.

References

Baylor
Baylor Bears football seasons
Baylor Bears football